Group D of the 1999 Fed Cup Europe/Africa Zone Group I was one of four pools in the Europe/Africa Zone Group I of the 1999 Fed Cup. Four teams competed in a round robin competition, with the top two teams advancing to the knockout stage.

Slovenia vs. Georgia

Luxembourg vs. Poland

Slovenia vs. Luxembourg

Poland vs. Georgia

Slovenia vs. Poland

Luxembourg vs. Georgia

  failed to win any ties in the pool, and thus was relegated to Group II in 2000, where they placed second in their 
pool of six.

See also
Fed Cup structure

References

External links
 Fed Cup website

1999 Fed Cup Europe/Africa Zone